"Big Girls Cry" is a single by Australian singer-songwriter Sia, from her sixth studio album 1000 Forms of Fear (2014). The single was not released internationally; it was only released in Australia and some parts of Europe. It charted in Belgium and hit the top 40 in Australia and France.

Electronic duo Odesza released a "choppy, chillwave" remix of "Big Girls Cry" on 5 December 2014. On 15 October 2014, Sia performed the song at The Recording Academy. On 2 April 2015, "Big Girls Cry" was released as the third single in the United Kingdom. Sia performed it live on Australian television show Sunrise on 21 April 2015.

Music video
On 2 April 2015, a video for the song was released on Sia's Vevo YouTube channel. The video features Maddie Ziegler in her trademark flesh-coloured leotard and blonde Sia bob facing the camera, in front of a black background, contorting her face and using her hands to express a slew of emotions. At one point a pair of hands come into the frame (shown in behind-the-scenes footage to be Sia's own hands) manipulating Ziegler's face and covering her mouth, they appear to lift Ziegler by the throat into the air until only her kicking feet are shown, then Ziegler drops back into the frame to resume her emotive facial contortions. The single shot video with various lighting and a plain black background is comparable to Lorde's "Tennis Court".

Sia revealed, in a behind-the-scenes video for "Elastic Heart", that she would be making a trilogy of videos with Ziegler. As in the first two videos in the series ("Chandelier" and "Elastic Heart"), the clip for "Big Girls Cry" was directed by Sia and Daniel Askill and choreographed by Ryan Heffington. As of June 2022, the video had received more than 300 million views. Since mid 2018, the video has not been available for viewers in Australia and New Zealand.

Charts

Weekly charts

Year-end charts

Certifications

Release history

References

External links

2014 singles
2014 songs
Sia (musician) songs
Songs written by Sia (musician)
Songs written by Chris Braide
Music videos directed by Daniel Askill
2010s ballads
Pop ballads